Caferağa Sports Hall, is a multi-purpose indoor arena located in Kadıköy, Istanbul, Turkey and opened in 1982. It is owned by the Municipality of Kadıköy and operated by the Directorate of Youth and Sport of Istanbul Province.

The arena with an audience capacity of 2850, hosts beside national and international sports events such as basketball, table tennis, volleyball, wrestling and weightlifting, concerts and congresses.

International sport events hosted 
 September 29–30, 2007 8th International Veterans Table Tennis Tournament

References

Sports venues in Istanbul
Basketball venues in Turkey
Volleyball venues in Turkey
Indoor arenas in Turkey
Sport in Kadıköy
Turkish Basketball League venues